A series premiere is the first aired installment of an episodic entertainment series, most often a television series. In the United States, many series premieres are aired in the fall time or, for mid-season replacements, either in the spring or late winter.

As distinguished from a pilot

A television series' first episode often originates as a pilot, a standalone episode that is used to sell the show to a television network. At the time of its creation, the pilot is meant to be the testing ground to gauge whether a series will be successful. As such, "Pilot" is overwhelmingly the most common title used for a series premiere.

Sometimes a series' pilot may be aired as a later episode or never aired at all. For the Canadian supernatural drama Lost Girl, the pilot that sold the series to Showcase, "Vexed", was used as the eighth episode of the first series. In the case of Firefly, the original pilot ("Serenity") was intended to serve as the series premiere but was rejected by the network, and a new first episode, "Train Job", was shot specifically for broadcast.

Other television series are commissioned "straight-to-series" where a network orders a season without viewing any produced episodes, hence no episode is considered a pilot. The straight-to-series model is usually used when established talent is attached to a series, or it is based on an established property or franchise. Amazing Stories (1985) is credited as being one of the first series commissioned without a pilot. The model has seen a rise since Netflix popularized it.

Most watched series premieres in the U.S.

See also
 Season premiere
 Season finale
 Series finale

References

Television terminology